Aravan is a district of Osh Region in south-western Kyrgyzstan. The administrative seat lies at Aravan.

Geography
The district lies in the south-east part of the Fergana Valley. It borders with the Chil'-Ustun Range in the north-east, and with the Keklik-Too mountains in the east. In the south, the district is occupied by the Jalgyz-Archa and the Ulu-Too mountains. In the west, it borders with Kerkidon reservoir. In the north, the topography of the area is flat, and in the south it rises, changing to hilly terrain. The difference in absolute elevations from north to south is 500-750 meters.

Demographics
As of 2009, Aravan District contained 48 villages.

Ethnic composition
According to the 2009 Census, the ethnic composition of the Aravan District (de jure population) was:

Rural communities and villages
In total, Aravan District include 50 settlements in 8 rural communities. Each rural community can consist of one or several villages. The rural communities in Aravan District are:

 Аllya Anarov (seat: Jangy-Aravan; incl. Aravan, Achchy, Kara-Bulak, Sasyk-Üngkür, Madaniyat and Pakhta-Abad)
 Chek-Abad (seat: Köchübaev; incl. Agronom, Jakshylyk, Jar-Kyshtak, Kukalapash, Maksim-Tobu, Pakhtachy and Tölöykön)
 Kerme-Too (seat: Gulbakhor; incl. Kichik-Alay, Kündölük, Maydan-Tal, Ming-Teke, Sary-Bulak and Chogom)
 Mangyt (seat: Mangyt; incl. Kesek, Kyzyl-Korgon, Tölöykön and Jangy-Aryk)
 Nurabad (seat: Kayragach-Aryk; incl. Kakyr-Piltan and Langar)
 S.Yusupov (seat: Aravan; incl. Karrak, Oktyabr, Erke-Kashka and Sutkor) 
 Tepe-Korgon (seat: Tepe-Korgon; incl. Arap, Internatsional, Kesov, Uygur-Abad, Chertik, Yangi-Abad and Yangi-Yul)
 Töö-Moyun (seat: Khauz; incl. Ak-Shor, Jeke-Miste, Kerkidan, Nayman, Sary-Tash and Syrt)

References

Districts of Osh Region